Nancy Dumont (1936–2002) was a Native American educational leader who lived in and worked in Chicago, Illinois and Montana.

Life and education
A member of the Assiniboine nation, Dumont grew up in the area of Wolf Point, Montana. After high school, she attended Haskell Institute where she graduated with a degree in business. In 1966, she moved to Chicago to attend Northwestern University where she earned a second BA. She returned to Montana briefly in the mid-1970s, relocated to the Midwest a second time to do a master's degree at the University of Chicago in 1983, and then returned to Montana.

Career
Dumont become an active leader in the Chicago Native American community and was part of the second generation of Native American leaders of the city's American Indian Center, which had been established by Willard LaMere and others in 1953.  She served on the founding board of directors of the Native American Educational Services College, the first urban institution of higher learning designed, managed, and serving Native Americans. The college was based on an initial set of proposals for a degree-granting institution combining academic and tribal knowledges that was drafted by a committee including her brother, Robert V. Dumont.

After returning to Montana in the 1980s, she worked at the Fort Peck Indian Reservation's Education Department, in Indian Child Welfare Programs, and in alcohol programs. She also served as the Federal Projects Coordinator at Wolf Point Public Schools.

See also

References

External links 
Nancy Dumont obituary

1936 births
2002 deaths
20th-century Native Americans
Assiniboine people
Native American leaders
People from Wolf Point, Montana
Female Native American leaders
20th-century Native American women
21st-century Native American women
21st-century Native Americans
Haskell Indian Nations University alumni
Native American educators
American women educators
Educators from Montana